Michael Hall is an independent Steiner Waldorf school in Kidbrooke Park on the edge of Ashdown Forest in East Sussex. Founded in 1925, it is the oldest Steiner school in Britain, and has a roll of 400 students aged between three (kindergarten) and eighteen (6th Form). The school owns a large amount of land.

Predominantly a day school, boarding is arranged with families of children at the school. It offers a broad education to boys and girls from pre-school to university entrance, based on the educational philosophy of Rudolf Steiner. The curriculum embodies cultural studies, sciences, general arts and humanities, crafts, music and movement and foreign languages. EFL is available in term time. The school explains its educational ethos, curriculum and approach to prospective parents at open mornings. A range of sports, games and extra-curricular activities is offered.

Entrance is non-selective and there is no streaming; for sixth-form entry an interview is conducted and GCSE grade C (or preferably higher) is required in selected sixth-form subjects.

History
The school was founded by a group of five people on the initiative of Daphne Olivier after she had attended one of Rudolf Steiner's educational conferences in Stuttgart in 1923. She approached Rudolf Steiner, asking for his support in founding the first Waldorf school in the English-speaking world. As she was speaking on behalf of three other women, Steiner asked if they could not include a suitable male teacher. This prompted Daphne to recommend her friend and future husband, Cecil Harwood, who met Rudolf Steiner in this manner for the first time and remained connected to the school for the rest of his life. It was founded in South London and named "The New School", until moving to Kidbrooke Park in Forest Row after World War II, whereupon it took on the name Michael Hall.

In November 2014 a book titled "A Good School" was published by Blue Filter documenting the first ninety years of the school's history. With an original manuscript by Joy Mansfield and edited by Brien Masters and Stephen Sheen, the book provides an overview of the school from its beginnings in Streatham to its current home in the Sussex countryside.

Kidbrooke Park

Kidbrooke Park is a grade II* listed house built for the Earl of Abergavenny at the time when Eridge Castle was in ruins and occupied by the Nevills until 1825. The date of construction is 1735 and it stands on 60 acres of parkland landscaped by the landscape architect Humphry Repton, which is separately listed at grade II.

A number of its facilities are available for hire including the reception hall (The Great Hall), The Long Room, The Round Room, The Terrace Room and The Oak Panelled Room for weddings, conferences, parties, film shoots and memorials. There is a theatre seating 450 persons, an expansive and modern gym and additional lecture studio capable of seating 80 people.

Former students
There is an association of former students run by the school's administration. Former students include:
Jean-Michel Le Gal - actor
Michaelina Argy MBE - Thalidomide campaigner 
Gavin Carr – conductor and opera singer
Oliver Chris – actor
Frank Dillane – actor, known for playing Young Tom Riddle in Harry Potter and the Half Blood Prince and Nick Clark in Fear the Walking Dead
John Davy – journalist
Winslow Eliot  – writer
Bella Freud – Young Designer of the Year
Eva Frommer – pioneering child psychiatrist, writer, translator and sponsor of Steiner publications
Marguerite Lundgren – eurythmist
Jonael Schickler – philosopher
Oliver Tobias – actor
Jonathan Westphal – philosopher
Sean Yates – international cyclist
Charlotte Tilbury - celebrity makeup artist and founder of eponymous makeup brand

References

Waldorf schools in the United Kingdom
Private schools in East Sussex
Educational institutions established in 1925
1925 establishments in England
Grade II* listed buildings in East Sussex
Grade II* listed houses
Grade II listed parks and gardens in East Sussex
Forest Row